Clash is a 2009 Vietnamese action martial arts film directed by Le Thanh Son and starring Johnny Tri Nguyen and actress/singer Veronica Ngo. Johnny Tri Nguyen and Veronica Ngo had recently appeared together in the 2007 film The Rebel.

Plot
Trinh codename Phoenix (Ngo Thanh Van), a female mob enforcer, must complete a series of organized crime jobs for her boss Hac Long (Hoang Phuc Nguyen) in order to win the release of her kidnapped daughter. She hires several mercenaries to help, including Quan dubbed Tiger (Johnny Tri Nguyen), who she becomes attracted to. Trinh and Quan's relationship becomes complicated as it becomes evident that their motivations are not the same.

Cast
 Johnny Tri Nguyen as Quan / Tiger
 Veronica Ngo as Trinh / Phoenix
 Hoang Phuc as Hac Long
 Lam Minh Thang as Cang / Snake
 Hieu Hien as Phong / Ox
 Tran The Vinh as Tuan / Hawk
 Dang Trung Tuan as A Lu
 Nguyen Hau as A Thoong
 Ly Anh Kiet as Minh
 Tran Huu Phuc as Thanh
 Dien Thai Minh as Hai
 Tawny Truc Nguyen as Female assassin
 Alain Bruxelles as French gangster
 François de la Torre as French gangster
 Jérôme as French gangster
 Thomas Michel Meyer as French gangster
 David Minetti as French gangster
 Rémi Recher as French gangster
 Yann Williot as French gangster

References

External links
 
 Clash at AllMovie

2009 films
Vietnamese-language films
Vietnamese action films
Vietnamese martial arts films
Vietnamese thriller films
Vietnamese crime films
Triad films
2009 action thriller films
2009 crime thriller films
Films set in Ho Chi Minh City
Films shot in Vietnam
2009 in Vietnam
Variance Films films
2000s Hong Kong films